The Arapahoe and Lost Creek Site is an archeological site in Sweetwater County, Wyoming. Site includes evidence of settlement over a  stretch along the terraces of Arapahoe Creek and Lost Creek. The site was used by Native Americans more or less continuously for 9000 years until about 1900. Site surveys indicate the presence of at least three dozen hearths, and buried features are believed to exist. The site was placed on the National Register of Historic Places on March 12, 1986.

References

External links
 Arapahoe and Lost Creek Sites at the Wyoming State Historic Preservation Office

		
National Register of Historic Places in Sweetwater County, Wyoming
Archaeological sites on the National Register of Historic Places in Wyoming